Dies may refer to:

 Dies (deity), the Roman counterpart of the Greek goddess Hemera, the personification of day, daughter of Nox (Night) and Erebus (Darkness).  
 Albert Christoph Dies (1755–1822), German painter, composer, and biographer
 Josh Dies (born 1983), American singer, songwriter, musician and author
 Martin Dies Jr. (1900–1972), Texas politician
 Martin Dies Sr. (1870–1922), Texas politician
 Die (integrated circuit), when used plurally

See also

 Die (disambiguation)